ADDA ((all-S,all-E)-3-amino-9-methoxy-2,6,8-trimethyl-10-phenyldeca-4,6-dienoic acid) is a non-proteinogenic amino acid found in toxins made by cyanobacteria.  Toxins which include this amino acid include microcystins and nodularins.

Along with leucine and arginine, it is found in microcystin-LR, an extremely toxic compound produced by cyanobacteria. In order to treat a water supply contaminated with microcystin-LR, chlorination can be used to oxidize the double bonds of ADDA in order to initiate the chemical breakdown of this compound.

References 

Non-proteinogenic amino acids